Arthur Marsh (4 May 1947 – 31 March 2020) was an English footballer who made 186 appearances in the Football League playing as a central defender for Bolton Wanderers, Rochdale and Darlington.

On 1 April 2020, his former club Bolton Wanderers announced that he had died at the age of 72.

References

1947 births
2020 deaths
People from Gornal, West Midlands
English footballers
Association football defenders
Bolton Wanderers F.C. players
Rochdale A.F.C. players
Darlington F.C. players
English Football League players